Vijayamangalam railway station is a railway station in Erode district, in Tamil Nadu, India.

References

Salem railway division
Railway stations in Erode district